Bjørn Nyland may refer to:

 Bjørn Nyland (skater) (born 1962), Norwegian speedskater
 Bjørn Nyland (YouTuber) (born 1979 in Thailand), Norwegian Youtuber a.k.a. TeslaBjørn